Nazli Nasr is a Pakistani actress. She is known for her roles in dramas Dhuwan, Mere Humdum Mere Dost, Zamani Manzil Kay Maskharay and Zip Bus Chup Raho.

Career
Fazli made her debut as an actress on PTV in 1990s. She appeared in drama Dhuwan as Sara in 1994. She was noted her roles in dramas Zip Bus Chup Raho, Mehar Bano aur Shah Bano, Family 93, Hum Tehray Gunahgaar and Meri Dulari. She also appeared in dramas Malika-e-Aliya, Piya Mann Bhaye, Roshini and Mere Humdum Mere Dost. Since then she appeared in dramas Teri Meri Kahani, Hari Hari Churiyaan, Makafaat, Hina Ki Khushboo and Zamani Manzil Kay Maskharay.

Filmography

Television

Telefilm

Film

References

External links
 

1979 births
Living people
20th-century Pakistani actresses
Pakistani television actresses
21st-century Pakistani actresses
Pakistani film actresses